Lee Chun-Seok (Hangul: 이춘석, born February 3, 1959, in South Korea) is a South Korean footballer.

He played in the K-League for the Daewoo Royals.

Honours
K-League Best XI : 1983

References
 

1959 births
Living people
Association football forwards
South Korean footballers
South Korea international footballers
Busan IPark players
Gimcheon Sangmu FC players
K League 1 players
FC Seoul non-playing staff
Yonsei University alumni